The 2017 Italian motorcycle Grand Prix was the sixth round of the 2017 Grand Prix motorcycle racing season. It was held at the Mugello Circuit in Scarperia on 4 June 2017.

Classification

MotoGP

Moto2 race report
In the Moto2 class, Mattia Pasini won his first Moto2 race and his first victory since the 250cc 2009 Italian Grand Prix.

Moto2

 Xavi Vierge was declared unfit to start the race due to a thoracic trauma following a crash in qualifying.

Moto3

Championship standings after the race

MotoGP
Below are the standings for the top five riders and constructors after round six has concluded.

Riders' Championship standings

Constructors' Championship standings

 Note: Only the top five positions are included for both sets of standings.

Moto2

Moto3

Notes

References

Italian
Motorcycle Grand Prix
Italian motorcycle Grand Prix
Italian